Roy Burke Ells (May 14, 1914 – February 22, 1979) was a provincial politician from Alberta, Canada. He served as a member of the Legislative Assembly of Alberta from 1959 to 1971 sitting with the Social Credit caucus in government.

Political career
Ells ran for a seat to the Alberta Legislature in the 1959 Alberta general election. He ran as the Social Credit candidate in the electoral district of Grouard. Ells defeated two other candidates with a landslide majority to pick the seat up for his party.

Ells ran for a second term in the 1963 Alberta general election. He defeated two candidates winning a slightly larger majority to hold his seat.

Ells ran for a third term in the 1967 Alberta general election. He faced a strong challenge from NDP candidate Stan Daniels, but managed to hold his seat winning just over half the popular vote.

Ells retired from the legislature in 1971.

References

External links
Legislative Assembly of Alberta Members Listing

Alberta Social Credit Party MLAs
1979 deaths
1914 births